"I'll Be Your Man" is a song by the British singer-songwriter James Blunt. It was released as the fourth single from his third studio album, Some Kind of Trouble. The single was released as a digital download single on 23 May 2011, and as a physical single on 9 September 2011. The song also was released in the United States, where Blunt performed on the Conan O'Brien show and Dancing with the Stars. A music video was released on 26 May 2011, and featured footage of Blunt's Some Kind of Trouble tour.

Critical reception
Marc Hirsh from Boston Globe said that: "Blunt’s happy on those Train tracks: He pulls the same trick nine songs later (minus the whoas) on "I’ll Be Your Man.'’ (“So baby come over from the end of the sofa,’’ the romantic sings on that one, too lazy to move five feet on his own.) Stephen Thomas Erlewine from AllMusic was positive, saying that: "Blunt’s strength is his embrace of soft rock cliché, whether he’s cheerfully bouncing along on "I’ll Be Your Man". Colin Somerville from Scotsman said positively that: "I'll Be Your Man is Blunt getting in touch with his inner teen idol, all chugging acoustic guitar and an excuse to twitch the pelvis." Simon Price from The Independent was negative, saying that: "When he tries to do "seductive" ("I'll Be Your Man") it's embarrassing." Mike Schiller from PopMatters said that: "“I’ll Be Your Man" could be John Cougar Mellencamp. Maybe such similarities could be chalked up to homage, to an artist wanting to pay tribute to those that made him such a success, but these songs are prototypical of their influences to the point of caricature", he completed.

Track listing
 UK Digital Download / Promo CD Single
 "I'll Be Your Man" (Single Version) - 3:36

 German CD Single
 "I'll Be Your Man" (Single Version) - 3:36
 "I'll Be Your Man" (Album Version) - 3:32
 "This Love Again" - 2:56
 "I'll Be Your Man" (Video)

Charts

Release history

References

2011 singles
Songs written by James Blunt
James Blunt songs
2010 songs
Atlantic Records singles
Custard Records singles
Songs written by Kevin Griffin
British soft rock songs